Calidviana is a genus of tropical and subtropical land snails with an operculum, terrestrial gastropod mollusks in the family Helicinidae.

Species 
Species within the genus Calidviana include:
 Calidviana littoricola (Gundlach in Pfeiffer, 1860)

References 

Helicinidae